The Hochkönig is a mountain group containing the highest mountain (Mount Hochkönig) in the Berchtesgaden Alps, Salzburgerland, Austria. The Berchtesgaden Alps form part of the Northern Limestone Alps.

Location
It lies to the west of the town of Bischofshofen in the Austrian state of Salzburg, 42 km due south of the city of Salzburg. Hochkönig is separated from the rest of the Berchtesgaden Alps, and more specifically from the Steinernes Meer (stone ocean) by the mountain pass Torscharte at 2246 m. The summit itself is at the southern edge of a large limestone plateau, which is covered by the glacier known as the "Übergossene Alm", however this glacier is currently shrinking at a rate of 6.2% per year, and is likely to vanish in the relatively near future.

The edge of the summit plateau is surrounded by an almost circular chain of mountains:
 Hochseiler, 
 Lammkopf, 
 Hochkönig, 
 Großer Bratschenkopf, 
 Kleiner Bratschenkopf, 
 Torsäule, 
 Schoberköpfe,  und 
 Floßkogel, 
 Eibleck, 
 Hohes Tenneck,

Hut
In 1898, the Österreichischer Touristenklub (Austrian Tourism Club) built an alpine hut at the summit. The current building dates from 1985 and can sleep nearly one hundred mountaineers. The massif is also home to the High King Mountain Ski Area.

Gallery

See also
 Bischofshofen
 Salzburg
 Salzburgerland
 Berchtesgaden Alps

References

External links
 High King Mountain Ski Area (Official - English)

Mountains of the Alps
Mountains of Salzburg (state)
Berchtesgaden Alps